Pseudolimnophila inornata is a species of limoniid crane fly in the family Limoniidae.

Subspecies
These two subspecies belong to the species Pseudolimnophila inornata:
 Pseudolimnophila inornata inornata
 Pseudolimnophila inornata vidua Alexander, 1943

References

Limoniidae
Articles created by Qbugbot
Insects described in 1869